Lung Mun is a station in Hong Kong's MTR  system. It is located at ground level of Lung Mun Road near Lung Mun Oasis in Tuen Mun District. It began service on 18 September 1988 and is located in Zone 1. It serves Lung Mun Oasis and Glorious Garden.

History
This stop was originally named "Hung Lau". It was then renamed to "San Shek Wan" in 1989. It was renamed again to the current "Lung Mun" in 2003 after Lung Mun Oasis was occupied in 1998.

References

MTR Light Rail stops
Former Kowloon–Canton Railway stations
Tuen Mun District
Railway stations in Hong Kong opened in 1988
MTR Light Rail stops named from housing estates